Samuel Beresford Childs  (November 6, 1861 – May 21, 1938) was a Major League Baseball first baseman for the 1883 Columbus Buckeyes. He appeared in one game for the Buckeyes on May 31, 1883, and was hitless in four at-bats. He played college ball at Yale University and played in the minors for Hartford from 1884–1885.

External links
baseball-reference

1861 births
1938 deaths
Major League Baseball first basemen
Columbus Buckeyes players
Hartford (minor league baseball) players
Hartford Babies players
Baseball players from Connecticut
19th-century baseball players